Bad Münder (also: Bad Münder am Deister; West Low German: Bad Münner) is a town in the Hamelin-Pyrmont district, Lower Saxony, Germany. The city with 16 districts has about 17,400 inhabitants (2020). The district Bad Münder is the administrative centre with about 8,000 inhabitants.

Sons and daughters of the town
 Georg Philipp Holscher (1792–1852), ophthalmologist
 Christian Ludwig Fröhlich (14 June 1799 – 11 March 1870), executioner in Hoya
 August Pott (born 1802 in Nettelrede; died 1887), linguist
 Friedrich Wilhelm Nolte (1880–1952), politician (German-Hanoverian Party)
 Leo Wispler (1890–1958), writer
 Hans Piepho (born 1909 in Eimbeckhausen; died 1996), zoologist, entomologist and university teacher
 Hildegard Falck (born 1949 in Nettelrede), Olympic champion runner
 Karl-Martin Hentschel (born 1950), politician, Alliance 90/The Greens
 Frank Jelinski (born 1953), racing driver

References

External links
 Official website (municipal)
 Official website (tourism)

Towns in Lower Saxony
Hameln-Pyrmont
Spa towns in Germany